The Wipper is a river in Saxony-Anhalt, Germany, a left tributary of the Saale. Its name comes from the old German word Uipparaha, which means "singing, bouncing river".

Course
The Wipper originates in the southeastern Harz, near Harzgerode at the bottom of Auerberg mountain. The Wipper joins the Saale in Bernburg.

Tributaries
The following rivers are tributaries of the Wipper:
 Schmale Else (L)
 Wolfsberger Wipper (R) near Dankerode
 Wippra Dam near Wippra
 Horla (R) near Wippra
 Schmale Wipper (L) near Wippra
 Hasselbach (R) near Wippra
 Brumbach (R) near Friesdorf
 Sengelbach (R) in Biesenrode
 Dorfbach (L) in Biesenrode
 Vatteröder Teich near Vatterode
 Ochsenpfuhlbach (R) near Vatterode
 Hagenbach (R) near Mansfeld
 Talbach (R) near Leimbach
 Fuchsbach (R) near Großörner
 Stockbach (L) near Großörner
 Alte Wipper, also known as Regenbeck (R) near  Burgörner
 Hadeborn (L) in Hettstedt
 Walbke, also known as Ölgrundbach (L) near Wiederstedt
 Rote Welle (L) near Salzkoth/ Aschersleben
 Eine (L) near Aschersleben
 Mühlgraben (L) near Groß Schierstedt

Towns
The following towns and cities lie along the Wipper:
Wippra, pop. 1552
Friesdorf
Rammelburg
Biesenrode
Vatterode
Leimbach
Großörner
Hettstedt, pop. 15,629
Wiederstedt, pop. 1074
Sandersleben, pop. 1988
Freckleben, part of the municipality of Aschersleben
Drohndorf, part of the municipality of Aschersleben
Mehringen
Aschersleben, pop. 29,357
Klein Schierstedt
Groß Schierstedt, pop. 630
Giersleben, pop. 1064
Warmsdorf, pop. 812
Güsten, pop. 4605
Osmarsleben
Ilberstedt, pop. 1155
Bernburg, pop. 35,897

Mills
Wippermühle in Wippra (today known as Mühlencafe)<ref>[http://www.muehlencafe-wippra.de Mühlencafe Wippra] (called 21 February 2010)</ref>
Kratzmühle between Friesdorf and Rammelburg, called after the first owner Nickel Kratz
Herrenmühle between Friesdorf and Rammelburg, (currently a garage) it used to be a hostel for ids
Klippmühle between Biesenrode and Vatterode: In 1848 August Schumann bought a flour and saw mill, which was taken over by Reinhold Schumann in 1893. When the railroad line Wipperliese'' was built, he opened a pub.

Flooding
 1994: Between April 12 and 13, 1994, heavy rain in the lower Harz mountains led to flooding on the Wipper.

See also
 List of rivers of Saxony-Anhalt

References 

 
Rivers of Saxony-Anhalt
Rivers of the Harz
Rivers of Germany